The Milan–Asso railway is a regional railway line with standard track gauge which links Milan to Canzo crossing for Erba and other towns in Brianza. The most northern terminal is the station of Canzo-Asso, which is located in Canzo's territory but is commonly known as Asso in the short form. That, because there is another station on the line called Canzo station and Canzo-Asso is next to Asso's boundary and serves this commune too.

The management of the railway and of the station is performed by FerrovieNord S.p.A., a society of the FNM group, which will hold authority until March 17, 2016, thanks to renewed concessions with the Decreto Dirigenziale del Ministero dei Trasporti e della Navigazione n. 3239/2000.

The regional and suburban passenger service is provided by Trenord Srl which works under a service contract negotiated with Regione Lombardia for period 2009–2020.

History

Project and construction
In 1877, the Belgian Albert Vaucamp, who obtained the grant for Milan-Saronno railway, presented to the Ministero dei Lavori Pubblici a request about the construction of another railway which linked Erba to Milan, using the line Milan Bovisa-Milan Cadorna. The engineer Ambrogio Campiglio wrote up the proposal to create a connection between the Saint Peter Martyr station of Seveso and the one in Camnago on Milan-Chiasso line.

The convention was stipulated on May 18, 1877 and approved with a legislative act on June 15 of the same year. By Regio Decreto of March 7, 1878 was approved the transfer of the grant to the Società Anonima Delle Ferrovie Milano-Saronno E Milano-Erba which in 1883 become Società Anonima Delle Ferrovie Nord Milano.

Beginning of the service 
The railway line was officially inaugurated on December 31, 1879, although in the previous months many sections were opened to the traffic as they were completed and tested. On July 16 the section Milan Bovisa-Paderno Dugnano was opened, then on August 14 trains could reach Bovisio Masciago-Mombello. On September 27 Seveso was linked. On October 18 the railway reached Mariano Comense and on November 22 Inverigo. On June 28 of the following year the section from Seveso to Camnago was opened. This section was linked to Milan-Chiasso railway, reducing by 6 kilometres the link between Milan and Como, so the Società Anonima immediately organized pairs of trains Milan Cadorna-Camnago in coincidence with the trains which stopped in Camnago station directed towards Como and Switzerland.

The section Milan Cadorna-Milan Bovisa, being in common with the railway Milan-Saronno, was provided of two rails on the road level. In 1887, thanks to a Società per le Strade Ferrate del Mediterraneo's request about the necessary enlargement of the freight of Milan Porta Sempione, Ferrovie Nord lowered to the trench level the line which crossed the old section between the old Central Station (situated where actually there's Milano Repubblica station) and the Milan Porta Genova. In 1895, because of the need of extending the via Mario Pagano park maneuvering, the section until Milan Cadorna was also transferred in trench.

In 1888, in collaboration with the Società Italiana per le strade ferrate meridionali, Ferrovie Nord Milano built a new station in Merone, named Merone-Ponte Nuovo station, in order to be used by Como–Lecco railway. Consequently, the old Merone station was abandoned.

First part of twentieth century: strengthening of infrastructure
Despite the huge traffic registered since its opening, Milano–Erba stayed on a single rail so many years. In 1909, the Milanese railway society presented a request in order to double the rails between Bovisa and Seveso and to add the third rail between Bovisa and Affori. However the Convention was signed four years later, on July 30, 1913, and approved with the Regio Decreto on August 29, 1913. First World War and other economical factors, for example the project of electrification, suggested Ferrovie Nord to delay the execution of this work until the second part of twenties: the double rail was inaugurated between Bovisa and Varedo on February 16, 1928, the one between this last station and Bovisio Masciago was opened on March 30, and Seveso could be reached by two rails since May 8.

Before the double rails, the extension of the line to Canzo and Asso was completed: this project born before twentieth. The convention in order to use Erba-Asso, stipulated with the competent ministers, was approved with Regio Decreto on October 5, 1913, n. 1350. The First World War stopped works which could restarted and be completed at the end of the conflict. The railway was opened on June 16, 1922 and the Erba-Incino station was abandoned because of a new Erba station situated in the east part of the town. In the meanwhile, because of the technical impossibility in reaching Asso, the station of Canzo-Asso was opened (in Canzo's territory) in order to serve the neighboring comune and the Valassina.

By the Regio Decreto on August 22, 1925, n. 1577, were approved the realization of an electrical supply on Milano–Saronno and Milano–Meda; the first studies of this project were in 1916. The system used by the Milanese society was the one of direct current with 3000 volts. The works about the implementation of the spars and the catenary were finished in autumn 1928, but the service with the new traction was activated later, in May 1929. Both the lines were fed by the electrical Novate Milanese substation.

The electrification project allowed Ferrovie Nord Milano to develop its social lines. There was the realization of the double Bovisa-Seveso, the stops in Affori and Cesano Maderno were converted in stations, the yard Librera was extended and other yards were built: Simonetta, Bovisasca and another one in Affori.

The section Meda–Canzo–Asso and the ramification Seveso–Camnago stayed by steam locomotive for many years. Trains which made service on the whole line changed traction from electrical to steam in Seveso, because Meda didn't have a turntable. Ferrovie Nord presented a request in order to a full electrification in 1941 together with other railway lines which were not electrified. Without waiting for formal concession, after the Second World War, the electrical traction was started on the section Seveso–Camnago on April 3, 1945. Meda-Erba was opened with the new traction on December 3, 1947, followed by Erba-Asso on January 20, 1948, always without waiting for the formal concession by the Italian government. The line was fed by a new substation near Erba station.

Second part of twentieth century and today
In the following years, the line was interested by many plans about the renewal of the materials and railway signalling by the railway Milanese society.
In 1955 the ramification Seveso-Camnago was finally closed to the passengers transport. At the beginning an autobus substituted this kind of service 1936 until the end of the Second World War, when FNM decided to recover it. This short section kept its activation in order to transport goods.
In 1999 started works in order to quadruple the section Milan Cadorna-Milan Bovisa, completed eight years later and inaugurated on September 9, 2007. Since December 2004 the railway includes two lines of the Milan suburban railway service, S2 and S4 and a new service of regional trains. On February 19, 2006 the section Seveso-Camnago was reopened to the passengers transport.

Because of the Protocollo di intesa per la definizione degli interventi a completamento e adeguamento del sistema di trasporto su ferro per l'area della Brianza some requalification works are provided on Milan-Asso in order to improve the security and the offer of the transport. Interventions are about the elimination of level crossings, the modernization of some stations on the line, the realization of the third rail between Milan Affori and Varedo and the double of the section between Seveso and Mariano Comense.

In 2011 the new station of Milan Affori was opened. It is situated further north than the previous structure and it is built in a position which allows an interchange with the Milan Metro Line 3.

Features

Armament and kind of traction
The line has a track gauge of ordinary type 1435 mm long. The electrical traction is 3000 Volt with direct current.
In the common section with Milano-Saronno railway, between Milan Cadorna and Milan Bovisa, the line has four rails. From Bovisa to Affori there are three rails, two of them are used by regional trains (which use a direct service) and one by suburban ones. The section Affori-Seveso has double rails. From Seveso to Canzo-Asso there's only one rail. The ramification from Seveso to Camnago has also one rail.

Operation system
The traffic on the section Seveso-Asso is ruled by the Dirigente Centrale Operativo (DCO) and its office is at Seveso railway station. Since August 22, 2008, the DCO also rules the section Bovisa-Seveso. However stations are attended by Rail Agents who check crossings and make ticket service.

Route
The railway present a trend South/North, crossing all the Brianza. Starting from Milan Bovisa, with a sinuous layout, with reduced radius turns, it cross suburbs Affori. This is the last station where regional trains stop until Cesano Maderno. Some meters later, there is Bruzzano station, then a turn towards Cormano-Cusano Milanino station.

Then the line directs towards Paderno Dugnano, which station is put in the city center, then it turns another time on the right in order to reach Palazzolo Milanese district, later Varedo, where the railway treaded a new turn on the left in order to serve Bovisio Masciago station. There a long straight leads trains to Cesano Maderno and Seveso, station where double rails end. Here there's the ramification in order to reach Camnago.

But the most of trains, turning clearly on the right, have to go towards Meda, then they follow, with a very sinuous track and in some ways similar to a tramway towards Cabiate and Mariano Comense, station provided by a closed rail and two normal rails.

From Mariano starts the greenest track of the line which undertakes a long straight until Carugo-Giussano and, after a detected turn, Arosio, which station stay in front of the Parish Church.

From Arosio starts one of the most beautiful section of the Italian railways. Trains with a full of curves cross a hilly area, in order to reach Inverigo station, panoramic place defined "Brianza's balcony", where it is possible enjoy about a very beautiful landscape.

Other curves in Brianza and then the train reach Lambrugo-Lurago d'Erba station.

From here convoys cross a wood where it is possible sight Baggero oasis, a wet area created by an old cement marl cave of the near cement in Merone, visible from the following namesake station.

Merone, in addition to the cement, presents a particularity: it is a crossing station with the RFI line Como – Lecco.

From here trains reach Erba; Erba railway station ubication was transferred from Corso XXV Aprile to Via Dante, remaining in Incino area.

From Erba starts the last section, which seems typical of a mountain line. After a corner, trains cross Lambro river in order to reach the closed Lezza-Carpesino station, which take the name from the districts where it is situated. Then by a rilevato they go to Pontelambro and the namesake station.

Trains cross Caslino d'Erba's tunnel, the longest FerrovieNord tunnel and subsequently arrive to Caslino station, one of the coldest area in Lombardia.

From Caslino d'Erba trains go across a steep ramp, with the 26 per 1000 inclination, in order to reach a rilevato where convoys go until the first Canzo station.

At the end, after having crossed Grimello tunnel, trains reach Canzo-Asso terminal, on Canzo territory, near Lambro river which, in correspondence with the branch waterfall Vallategna, divide two municipalities and, above all, it separate Brianza from Vallassina.

Traffic
Since December 12, 2004 along this railway line there are two services:
Suburban service, constituted by S2 and S4 line of the Milan suburban railway service.
Regional service.
Suburban services stop at all the stations in the Milan metropolitan area and settle at Mariano Comense about S2 line and at Camnago-Lentate, on the near Milan-Chiasso, about S4 line.

Because of lacks of infrastructures and works in progress along the line, services are not in the true regime according to theorical criterion which define Lombard suburban and regional railway service features. The future implementation should provide one S2 and S4 run every half hour and the consequent division between the suburban and regional services, with the speeding of the regional one, which today must stop in some stations of suburban contest.

The reliability index average related to 2008 settle on about 4,62% and it is resulted to be the tallest between LeNord lines (Milan-Novara 2,71%, Milan-Varese-Laveno 1,96% and Milan-Como 1,78%).

Railway lines in Lombardy
Railway lines opened in 1879